Darantaleh is a town in the eastern Sool region of Somaliland/Somalia.

References
Darantaleh

Populated places in Sool, Somaliland